This is the list of the Badminton players who participated at the 2016 Summer Olympics in Rio de Janeiro, Brazil from 11–20 August 2016.

External links
http://olympics.bwfbadminton.com/
https://www.olympic.org/athletes

References

2016 Summer Olympics
Badminton at the 2016 Summer Olympics
Badminton